Garra arunachalensis is a fish species in the genus Garra endemic to India.

References

External links 

Cyprinid fish of Asia
Taxa named by Kongbrailatpan Nebeshwar Sharma
Taxa named by Waikhom Vishwanath
Fish described in 2013
Garra